Xenocytaea anomala is a jumping spider.

Name
The epitheton anomala indicates the divergence of some characters of the species with others of the genus (e.g. the epigynum).

Appearance
Xenocytaea anomala is about 3mm long, with females slightly larger.

Distribution
Xenocytaea anomala is only known from the Palau District on the western Caroline Islands.

References
 Berry, J.W., Beatty, J.A. & Proszynski, J. (1998). Salticidae of the Pacific Islands. III. Distribution of Seven Genera, with Description of Nineteen New Species and Two New Genera. Journal of Arachnology 26(2):149-189. PDF

Salticidae
Spiders of Oceania
Spiders described in 1998